Advaita Bodha Deepika, Lamp of Non-Dual Knowledge, is an Advaita Vedanta text written by Sri Karapatra Swami.

Contents
The Advaita Bodha Deepika is set as a dialogue between a master and a student. Just like other medieval Advaita Vedanta texts, samadhi is added to sravana, manana and nididhyasana.

Appreciation
The Advaita Bodha Deepika was highly regarded by Ramana Maharshi.

References

Sources

Further reading
 Lamp of Non-dual Knowledge & Cream of Liberation: Two Jewels of Indian Wisdom, Wisdom Publications

External links
 Advaita Bodha Deepika (pdf)

Advaita
Hindu texts
Advaita Vedanta texts